Autosomal recessive cerebellar ataxia type 1 (ARCA1) is a condition characterized by progressive problems with movement. Signs and symptoms of the disorder first appear in early to mid-adulthood. People with this condition initially experience impaired speech (dysarthria), problems with coordination and balance (ataxia), or both. They may also have difficulty with movements that involve judging distance or scale (dysmetria). Other features of ARCA1 include abnormal eye movements (nystagmus) and problems following the movements of objects with their eyes. The movement problems are slowly progressive, often resulting in the need for a cane, walker, or wheelchair.

Presentation 
Most cases of autosomal recessive cerebellar ataxia are early onset, usually around the age of 20. People with this type of ataxia share many characteristic symptoms including:
 frequent falls due to poor balance
 imprecise hand coordination
 postural or kinetic tremor of extremities or trunk
 dysarthria
 dysphasia
 vertigo
 diplopia
 lower extremity tendon reflexes
 dysmetria
 minor abnormalities in ocular saccades
 attention defects
 impaired verbal working memory and visuospatial skills
 Normal life expectancy
Autosomal recessive ataxias are generally associated with a loss of proprioception and vibration sense. Arreflexia is more common in autosomal recessive ataxia than autosomal dominant ataxias. Also, they tend to have more involvement outside of the nervous system. Mutations in subunit of the mitochondrial DNA polymerase (POLG) have been found to be a potential cause of autosomal recessive cerebellar ataxia.

Cause
ARCA1 is caused by the mutated SYNE1 gene that is vital for the synthesis of Syne-1 protein in the Purkinje cells of the cerebellum. Deformed Syne-1 protein disrupts normal Purkinje cell functions and impairs its signalling with cerebellar neurons. To date it is still unclear how the impaired syne-1 proteins leads to the loss of cells in the cerebellum that contribute to ARCA1.

Genetics 
Ataxia with telangiectasia is a rare form ataxia that causes chromosomal instability, sensitivity to ionizing radiation, disrupted stress-activated signal transduction pathways and radioresistant DNA synthesis.

The genes that underlie majority of the symptoms for the different types of ataxia are still unknown. A productive cure is still unavailable to prevent the brain degeneration associated with ataxia.

Oculomotor ataxia accompanies gait ataxia which causes dysarthria, muscle weakness, loss of joint position sense and limb dysmetria. In some cases, patients have shown mental retardation and loss of myelinated axons.

Diagnosis 
Clinical diagnosis is conducted on individuals with age onset between late teens and late forties who show the initial characteristics for the recessive autosomal cerebellar ataxia.
The following tests are performed:
 MRI brain screening for cerebellum atrophy.
 Molecular genetic testing for SYNE-1 sequence analysis.
 Electrophysiologic studies for polyneuropathy
 Neurological examination

Prenatal diagnosis and preimplantation genetic diagnosis (PGD) can be performed to identify the mothers carrying the recessive genes for cerebellar ataxia.

Types 
The classification of autosomal recessive ataxias takes into consideration the phenotypes 

There are different types of ataxias:
 congenital ataxias (developmental disorders)
 ataxias with metabolic disorders
 ataxias with a DNA repair defect
 degenerative ataxias
 ataxia associated with other features.

Treatments 
 Occupational and physical therapy is available for gait dysfunction.
 Abetalipoproteinemia treatment is received for its potential in preventing vitamin E deficiency. (1000 mg/day for infants and over 5,000 mg/day for adults.)
 Co Q10 supplementation (300 to 600 mg/day) for coenzyme Q10 deficiency.

Prognosis
In most cases, between the age of 2 and 4 oculomotor signals are present. Between the age of 2 and 8, telangiectasias appears. Usually by the age of 10 the child needs a wheel chair. Individuals with autosomal recessive cerebellum ataxia usually survive until their 20s; in some cases individuals have survived until their 40s or 50s.

Notes

References
 Fogel, Brent L., and Susan Perlman. "Clinical Features and Molecular Genetics of Autosomal Recessive Cerebellar Ataxias." Lancet Neural. Lancet Neural, 2007. Web. 30 Apr. 2013. <https://web.archive.org/web/20160303212502/http://xa.yimg.com/kq/groups/17470070/998190594/name/Clinical+features+and+molecular+genetics+of+autosomal+recessive+cerebellar+ataxias.pdf>.
 
 Palau, Francesc. Autosomal Recessive Cerebellar Ataxias. May 1, 2013. Orphonet Journal of Rare Diseases. 17 November 2006

External links 

Cerebellum
Neurological disorders
Symptoms and signs: Nervous system